This is a list of reptiles found in Lebanon.

Emydid turtles
Balkan terrapin, Mauremys rivulata

Land tortoises
Greek tortoise, Testudo graeca

Marine turtles
Loggerhead turtle, Caretta caretta
Green turtle, Chelonia mydas

Softshell turtles
Nile softshell turtle, Trionyx triunguis

Agamid lizards
Rough-tailed rock agama, Laudakia stellio
Trapelus ruderatus

Chameleons
Mediterranean chameleon, Chamaeleo chamaeleon

Geckos
Levant fan-fingered gecko, Ptyodactylus puiseuxi
Kotschy's gecko, Mediodactylus kotschyi
Turkish gecko, Hemidactylus turcicus

Lacertid lizards
Giant fringe-fingered lizard, Acanthodactylus grandis
Schreiber's fringe-fingered lizard, Acanthodactylus schreiberi
Lebanon fringe-fingered lizard, Acanthodactylus tristrami
Wall lizard, Podarcis muralis
Fraas's lizard, Parvilacerta fraasii
Phoenicolacerta kulzeri
Lebanon lizard, Phoenicolacerta laevis
Levant green lizard, Lacerta media
Blanford's short-nosed desert lizard, Mesalina brevirostris
European snake-eyed lizard, Ophisops elegans

Skinks
Rüppell's snake-eyed skink, Ablepharus rueppellii
Ocellated skink, Chalcides ocellatus
Bridled skink, Heremites vittatus
Schneider's skink, Eumeces schneiderii
Lataste's snake skink, Ophiomorus latastii
Golden grass mabuya, Heremites auratus
Budak's snake-eyed skink, Ablepharus budaki

Legless lizards
European glass lizard, Pseudopus apodus
Chalcides guentheri

Monitor lizards
Desert monitor, Varanus griseus

Amphisbaenids
Turkish worm lizard, Blanus strauchi

Blind snakes
European blind snake, Xerotyphlops vermicularis

Pythons and boas
Caucasian sand boa, Eryx jaculus

Colubrid snakes
Black whipsnake, Dolichophis jugularis
Coin-marked snake, Hemorrhois nummifer
Roger's racer, Platyceps rogersi
Red whip snake, Platyceps collaris
Eirenis decemlineatus, Eirenis decemlineatus
Eirenis levantinus
Asia Minor dwarf racer, Eirenis modestus
Transcaucasian ratsnake, Zamenis hohenackeri
Montpellier snake, Malpolon insignutus
Dice snake, Natrix tessellata
European tiger snake, Telescopus fallax syriacus

Elapids
Black desert cobra, Walterinnesia aegyptia

Burrowing asps
Israeli mole viper, Atractaspis engaddensis
Müller's two-headed snake, Micrelaps muelleri

Vipers and pit vipers
Lebanon viper, Montivipera bornmuelleri
Levant viper, Macrovipera lebetinus
Palestine viper, Daboia palaestinae

References

https://web.archive.org/web/20070927031259/http://www.shoufcedar.org/mamal.asp
https://web.archive.org/web/20070107080429/http://en.arocha.org/lbaammiq/index4.html
http://www.iucnredlist.org/search/search.php?freetext=&modifier=phrase&criteria=wholedb&taxa_species=1&redlistCategory%5B%5D=all&redlistAssessyear%5B%5D=all&country%5B%5D=LB&aquatic%5B%5D=all&regions%5B%5D=all&habitats%5B%5D=all&threats%5B%5D=all&Submit.x=47&Submit.y=6
http://www.unep-wcmc.org/isdb/Taxonomy/country.cfm?displaylanguage=ENG&search=all&Country=LB

Reptiles
Lebanon
Lebanon